Novopetrovskoye is a rural locality (a selo) in Novopetrovsky Selsoviet, Kugarchinsky District, Bashkortostan, Russia. The population was 201 as of 2010. There are 3 streets.

Geography 
Novopetrovskoye is located 17 km southwest of Mrakovo (the district's administrative centre) by road. Starokhvalynsky is the nearest rural locality.

References 

Rural localities in Kugarchinsky District